North from Here is the second album by the Finnish metal band Sentenced. Lyrics of the album deal with Sentenced's typical melancholy, but some also deal with the mythology and history of Finnish warfare and the national romantic epic of Kalevala. Prior the release of North From Here the band had developed their playing skills further and established a more personal sound, drawing influence from a number of extreme metal bands including Atheist, Nocturnus, Bathory and the early works of Darkthrone (namely the band's death metal debut, Soulside Journey), but on the opposite spectrum, also more rock-oriented acts such as Faith No More and Primus.

Track listing

2008 reissue bonus disc

Journey to Pohjola (demo 1992) 

"Wings" – 5:09
"In Memoriam" – 5:26
"Mystic Silence (As They Wander in the Mist)" – 4:14

The Trooper EP (1994) 

"The Trooper" (Iron Maiden cover) – 3:16
"Desert by Night" – 6:29
"In Memoriam (Old School Mastering)" – 5:25
"Awaiting the Winter Frost (Old School Mastering)" – 5:48

Lost Treasures 

"The Glow of 1000 Suns" – 4:30
"Amok Run" – 4:43

Credits 
Sami Lopakka – guitars, keyboards
Miika Tenkula – guitars
Taneli Jarva – bass, vocals
Vesa Ranta – drums

References 

Sentenced albums
1993 albums
Century Media Records albums